South Sinai Governorate is the least populated governorate of Egypt. It is located in the east of the country, encompassing the southern half of the Sinai Peninsula. Saint Catherine's Monastery, an Eastern Orthodox Church monastery and UNESCO World Heritage Site of world renown, is located in the central part of the governorate.

Municipal divisions
The governorate is divided into the following municipal divisions for administrative purposes with a total estimated population as of July 2017 of 102,507.

Tourism
The governorate is an attractive destination for tourism due to its amazing and fascinating nature scenes, however it has several terrorist attacks. In 1985, a mass murder occurred in the Ras Burqa resort and killed 8 people (7 Israeli tourists and 1 Egyptian policeman). The 2004 Sinai bombings that targeted tourist hotels in and around Nuweiba killed 34 people and wounded over 170. In 2005, Sharm El Sheikh was hit by a terrorist attack. 88 people were killed, the majority of them Egyptians, and over 200 were wounded, at that time making it the deadliest terrorist action in the country's history (exceeding the Luxor massacre of 1997, which killed 62 people). 2006 saw the Dahab bombings, which killed 23 people and wounded 80.

The Sinai insurgency, although happening mainly in the neighboring North Sinai Governorate, has occasionally spilled over to South Sinai. In February 2014, a tourist bus was attacked in Taba. The perpetrators killed the Egyptian bus driver and three South Korean tourists. 

After 2014, The Egyptian government and the Egyptian army took firm actions to eliminate terrorism, and now the city is quite safe.

Demographics
According to population estimates, in 2015 the majority of residents in the governorate lived in urban areas, with an urbanization rate of 51.1%. Out of an estimated 167,426 people residing in the governorate, 85,502 people lived in urban areas as opposed to only 81,924 in rural areas. The Bedouin inhabit the Mount Sinai area. Due to poor accessibility, at times the orchards in the mountains have served to hide narcotics smugglers in the region.

Landmarks

Saint Catherine's Monastery, an Eastern Orthodox Church monastery and UNESCO World Heritage Site of world renown, is located in central part of the governorate, at the mouth of a gorge at the foot of Mount Sinai, in the city of Saint Catherine, Egypt. Built between 548 and 565, the monastery is one of the oldest working Christian monasteries in the world. The site contains the world's oldest continually operating library, possessing many unique books including the Syriac Sinaiticus and, until 1859, the Codex Sinaiticus.

Raithu Monastery is situated in El Tor. It was built on a site where some 40 monks were massacred in the 4th or 5th century.

Cities and towns
 Dahab
 El Tor
 Nuweiba
 Saint Catherine
 Sharm El Sheikh
 Taba
Ras sudr

Sites
 Wadi Mukattab
 Wadi Feiran

References

External links
 El Wattan News of South Sinai Governorate

 
Governorates of Egypt